West Virginia Route 46 is an east–west state highway split into two segments in Mineral County, West Virginia, United States. The western terminus of the western segment is at West Virginia Route 42 in Elk Garden. The eastern terminus is at the Maryland state line north of Beryl, where WV 46 crosses the Potomac River and intersects Maryland Route 135 on the north bank.

The western terminus of the eastern segment is at the Maryland state line in Piedmont, where WV 46 continues into Maryland as Maryland Route 36. The eastern terminus is at West Virginia Route 28 in Fort Ashby.

The two segments are connected by a two-mile (3 km) portion of MD 135 and MD 36 in Maryland's Allegany County.

Attractions
Jennings Randolph Lake

Major intersections

References

046
West Virginia Route 046